Vernon Regional Transit System provides bus service to destinations in Vernon, Coldstream and North Okanagan area of British Columbia, using fully accessible low floor transit buses.

This transit system is responsible for all local full-service and handyDART public bus transportation, in cooperation with the provincial agency BC Transit. Currently, thirteen scheduled routes are operated under the Vernon Regional Transit System name, as well as various other community bus services.

Routes

References

External links
Vernon Regional Transit System

Transit agencies in British Columbia
Vernon, British Columbia